Walking Home from Nicole's is Norwegian band Minor Majority's debut album released in 2001.

Track listing
Easy And Safe
What I Deserve
Electrolove
Singalongsong
She's A New Yorker
A Kid That Used To Look Like Me
Passion For Property
Judy's Got A Hunch
Walking Home From Nicole's
Goodbye Again

2001 debut albums
Minor Majority albums